Phra Visuddhisamvarathera , known as Ajahn Brahmavaṃso, or simply Ajahn Brahm (born Peter Betts on 7 August 1951), is a British-born Theravada Buddhist monk. Currently, Ajahn Brahm is the abbot of Bodhinyana Monastery in Serpentine, Western Australia; Spiritual Adviser to the Buddhist Society of Victoria; Spiritual Adviser to the Buddhist Society of South Australia; Spiritual Patron of the Buddhist Fellowship in Singapore; Patron of the Brahm Centre in Singapore; Spiritual Adviser to the Anukampa Bhikkhuni Project in the UK; and Spiritual Director of the Buddhist Society of Western Australia (BSWA). He returned to the office on 22 April 2018 after briefly resigning in March, following a contentious vote by members of the BSWA during their annual general meeting.

Early life
Peter Betts was born in London. He came from a working-class background and went to Latymer Upper School. He won a scholarship to study theoretical physics at Emmanuel College, University of Cambridge in the late 1960s. After graduation, he taught mathematics at a high school in Devon for one year before travelling to Thailand to become a monk and train with Ajahn Chah Bodhinyana Mahathera. Brahm was ordained in Bangkok at the age of twenty-three by Somdet Kiaw, the abbot of Wat Saket. He subsequently spent nine years studying and training in the forest meditation tradition under Ajahn Chah.

Bodhinyana Monastery
After practicing for nine years as a monk, Ajahn Brahm was sent to Perth by Ajahn Chah in 1983 to assist Ajahn Jagaro in teaching duties. Initially, they both lived in an old house on Magnolia Street, in the suburb of North Perth, but in late 1983, they purchased 97 acres (393,000 m²) of rural and forested land in the hills of Serpentine, south of Perth. The land was to become Bodhinyana Monastery (named after their teacher, Ajahn Chah Bodhinyana). Bodhinyana was to become the first dedicated Buddhist monastery of the Thai Theravada lineage in the Southern Hemisphere and is today the largest community of Buddhist monks in Australia. Initially, there were no buildings on the land and as there were only a few Buddhists in Perth at this time, and little funding, the monks themselves began building to save money. Ajahn Brahm learnt plumbing and bricklaying and built many of the current buildings himself.

In 1994, Ajahn Jagaro took a sabbatical leave from Western Australia and disrobed a year later. Left in charge, Ajahn Brahm took on the role and was soon being invited to provide his teachings in other parts of Australia and Southeast Asia. He has been a speaker at the International Buddhist Summit in Phnom Penh in 2002 and at three Global Conferences on Buddhism. He also dedicates time and attention to the sick and dying, those in prison or ill with cancer, people wanting to learn to meditate, and also to his Sangha of monks at Bodhinyana. Ajahn Brahm has also been influential in establishing Dhammasara Nuns' Monastery at Gidgegannup in the hills northeast of Perth to be a wholly independent monastery, which is jointly administered by Ayya Nirodha and Venerable Hasapañña.

Bhikkhuni ordination
On 22 October 2009, Ajahn Brahm, along with Bhante Sujato, facilitated an ordination ceremony for bhikkhunis, where four female Buddhists, Venerable Ajahn Vayama, and Venerables Nirodha, Seri, and Hasapañña, were ordained into the Western Theravada Bhikkhuni Sangha, with Venerable Tathālokā Bhikkhunī serving as Bhikkhunī Preceptor. The ordination ceremony took place at Ajahn Brahm's Bodhinyana Monastery at Serpentine, Australia. Although bhikkhuni ordinations had taken place in California and Sri Lanka, this was the first in the Thai Forest Tradition and proved highly controversial in Thailand. There is no consensus in the wider tradition that bhikkhuni ordinations could be valid, having last been performed in Thailand over 1,000 years ago, though the matter has been under active discussion for some time. Ajahn Brahm claims that there is no valid historical basis for denying ordination to bhikkunis.

For his actions of 22 October 2009, on 1 November 2009, at a meeting of senior members of the Thai forest monastic Sangha in the Ajahn Chah lineage, held at Wat Pah Pong, Ubon Ratchathani, Brahm was removed from the Ajahn Chah Forest Sangha lineage and is no longer associated with the main monastery in Thailand, Wat Pah Pong, nor with any of the other Western Forest Sangha branch monasteries of the Ajahn Chah tradition.

Anukampa Bhikkhuni Project
In October 2015, Ajahn Brahm asked Venerable Candā of Dhammasara Nun's Monastery, Perth, to take steps towards establishing a monastery in the UK. In response to this, Anukampa Bhikkhuni Project was born. Anukampa Bhikkhuni Project aims to promote the teachings and practices of early Buddhism by establishing a Bhikkhuni presence in the UK. Its long-term aspiration is to develop a monastery with a harmonious and meditative atmosphere, for women who wish to train towards full ordination.

LGB support
Ajahn Brahm has openly spoken about his support towards same-sex marriage. At a conference in Singapore in 2014, he said he was very proud to have been able to perform a same-sex marriage blessing for a couple in Norway, and stressed that Buddhist teachings do not discriminate on the basis of sexual orientation.

Rohingya crisis
In 2015, during the Rohingya refugee crisis, the Buddhist Society of Western Australia donated money to support displaced orphans in Bangladesh. Speaking at the ceremony, Ajahn Brahm said:

Kindfulness
In an effort to reclaim the "mindfulness" practice from being overrun by secular industries and a recent claim that it is not owned by Buddhism, Ajahn Brahm clarifies that mindfulness is a practice within the rest of the supporting factors of Buddhism (the Noble Eightfold Path: right view, right motivation, right speech, right action, right livelihood, right endeavor, right mindfulness, and right stillness). According to the monk, mindfulness is part of a great training called Buddhism, and to actually take away mindfulness from Buddhism is unhelpful, inaccurate, and deceiving—mindfulness is a cultural heritage of Buddhism. Practicing mindfulness without wisdom and compassion is not enough. Therefore, drawing from the Pāli Suttas, Ajahn Brahm created the term "Kindfulness", meaning mindfulness combined with wisdom and compassion—mindfulness combined with knowing the ethical and moral compassionate consequences of the reactions to what is happening (a.k.a. satisampajañña).

Achievements
Whilst still a junior monk, Ajahn Brahm was asked to undertake the compilation of an English-language guide to the Buddhist monastic code—the vinaya—which later became the basis for monastic discipline in many Theravadan monasteries in Western countries. Currently, Brahm is the Abbot of Bodhinyana Monastery in Serpentine, Western Australia, the Spiritual Director of the Buddhist Society of Western Australia, Spiritual Adviser to the Buddhist Society of Victoria, Spiritual Adviser to the Buddhist Society of South Australia, Spiritual Patron of the Buddhist Fellowship in Singapore and most recently, Spiritual Adviser to the Anukampa Bhikkhuni Project in the UK.

In October 2004, Ajahn Brahm was awarded the John Curtin medal for his vision, leadership, and service to the Australian community, by Curtin University.

Under the auspices of the Diamond Jubilee of King Rama IX, Bhumibol Adulyadej, in June 2006, Ajahn Brahm was given the title of Phra Visuddhisamvarathera, a Royal Grade Thai ecclesiastical title once held by Ajahn Liem, the current abbot of Wat Nong Pah Pong.

On 5 September 2019, Ajahn Brahm was awarded the Order of Australia, General Division medal, for services to Buddhism and gender equality. The investiture was performed at Government House Western Australia.

Publications
 Opening the Door of Your Heart: and Other Buddhist Tales of Happiness.  Also published as Who Ordered This Truckload of Dung?: Inspiring Stories for Welcoming Life's Difficulties. Wisdom Publications.  (2005)
 Mindfulness, Bliss, and Beyond: A Meditator's Handbook. Wisdom Publications.  (2006)
 The Art of Disappearing: Buddha's Path to Lasting Joy. Wisdom Publications.  (2011)
 Don't Worry, Be Grumpy: Inspiring Stories for Making the Most of Each Moment. Also published as Good? Bad? Who Knows?. Wisdom Publications.   (2014)
 Kindfulness. Wisdom Publications.  (2016)
 Bear Awareness: Questions and Answers on Taming Your Wild Mind.  Wisdom Publications.  (2017)
 Falling Is Flying: The Dharma of Facing Adversity – with Guo Jun. Wisdom Publications.  (2019)

Publications by BPS
In the Presence of Nibbana (BL149)
Ending of Things (BL153)
Walking Meditation: The Expositions on Walking Meditation (WH464) (with Ajahn Nyanadhammo and Dharma Dorje)
Opening the Door of Your Heart (BP619s)

References

Further reading
 
 
   The full transcript from the 28 February 2009 interview is available on Buddhanet.

External links

 Ajahn Brahm at Buddhist Society of Western Australia website
 Simply This Moment - A Collection of Talks on Buddhist Practice by Ajahn Brahm''

1951 births
Alumni of the University of Cambridge
Australian Buddhists
English expatriates in Australia
Theravada Buddhism writers
Converts to Buddhism
English Buddhists
English Theravada Buddhists
Theravada Buddhist monks
Living people
Nonviolence advocates
Writers from London
People educated at Latymer Upper School
Members of the Order of Australia